Isochariesthes multiguttata is a species of beetle in the family Cerambycidae. It was described by Hunt and Stephan von Breuning in 1955, originally under the genus Pseudochariesthes. It is known from Eswatini and South Africa.

References

multiguttata
Beetles described in 1955